The Monti Sabatini is a geologic region in Lazio, central Italy, a remnant of intense volcanism which started ca. 600,000 years ago, mainly with pyroclastic and maar forming eruptions which continued until 100,000 years ago. The region is classified as a dormant volcanic district. The mountains are part of the Lazio's Anti-Apennines. Included between the Monti Sabatini is the Lake Bracciano, which is a volcanotectonic depression formed about 3.7 Ma, and the Lake Martignano. The sedimentary base of the Sabatini complex lies buried under  of volcanic ash and rocks.

Other mountains in the area include Monti della Tolfa, Monte Soratte, and more southwards, by the Monti Cornicolani.

See also
List of volcanoes in Italy
Monti Volsini
Monti Cimini

References

External links
 Sabatini Volcanic Complex.
 Sabatini, Italy
 

Volcanoes of Italy
Maars of Italy
Sabatini
Sabatini
Metropolitan City of Rome Capital
Geographical, historical and cultural regions of Italy
Falisci